Cucullanus epinepheli is a species of parasitic nematodes. It is an endoparasite of the brown spotted reef cod Epinephelus chlorostigma. The species has been described in 2018 by František Moravec & Jean-Lou Justine from material collected off New Caledonia in the South Pacific Ocean.

Cucullanus epinepheli was characterized from other members of the genus Cucullanus mainly in possessing a unique structure of the anterior, elevated cloacal lip with a large posterior outgrowth covering the cloacal aperture and in the presence of cervical alae and two small preanal papillae on the median dome-shaped precloacal elevation.

References 

Ascaridida
Parasitic nematodes of fish
Nematodes described in 2018
Fauna of New Caledonia
Endoparasites